Ponciano Vázquez Parissi (born 29 October 1983) is a Mexican politician affiliated to the PRI. As of 2013 he served as Deputy of the LXII Legislature of the Mexican Congress representing Veracruz.

References

1983 births
Living people
Politicians from Veracruz
Institutional Revolutionary Party politicians
Deputies of the LXII Legislature of Mexico
Members of the Chamber of Deputies (Mexico) for Veracruz